Denzil Forrester  (born 1956) is a Grenada-born artist who moved to England as a child in 1967. Previously based in London, where he was a lecturer at Morley College, he moved to Truro, Cornwall, in 2016.

Biography

Born in 1956 in Grenada in the Caribbean, Denzil Forrester moved to England when he was aged 10. He attended the Central School of Art, earning a BA degree, and was one of only a few Black artists to gain an MA in Fine Art (Painting) at the Royal College of Art in the early 1980s. Since then, his work has been widely shown in many exhibitions. In 1983, he won the Rome Scholarship, and subsequently received a Harkness Scholarship that enabled him to spend 18 months in New York City.

He has also been the recipient of two major awards at the Royal Academy Summer Show, including in 1987 the Korn/Ferry International Award. His paintings are in the collections of Freshfields, the Arts Council of Great Britain, the Harris Museum and Art Gallery, Preston, and the Walker Collection, Atlanta.

Notable exhibitions in which Forrester has participated include From Two Worlds, at the Whitechapel Art Gallery in 1986, and Dub Transition: A Decade of Paintings 1980–1990 (1990). In 1995, he organised and curated The Caribbean Connection, exhibitions and cultural exchanges around the work of Caribbean artists. The exhibition was held from 15 September to 13 October 1995 at the Islington Arts Factory (where Forrester's studio was located) featured Ronald Moody (from Jamaica), Aubrey Williams (Guyana), Frank Bowling (Guyana), John Lyons (Trinidad) and Bill Ming (Bermuda), with the catalogue providing a "Historical Background Sketch" by John La Rose and Errol Lloyd.

Forrester's recent exhibition, From Trench Town to Porthowan, at the Jackson Foundation Gallery in Cornwall from 26 May to 23 June 2018, was a retrospective curated by Peter Doig and Matthew Higgs.

In 2019, Art on the Underground commissioned Forrester’s first major public commission, a large-scale artwork titled ‘Brixton Blue', to be on view at Brixton station from September 2019 to September 2020.

Forrester was appointed Member of the Order of the British Empire (MBE) in the 2021 New Year Honours for services to art.

Themes

In common with other early Black British artists, such as Tam Joseph and Eugene Palmer, having been born in the Caribbean and brought up in the UK Forrester reflects in his paintings a duality of cultural influences; as John Lyons observed: "Denzil's respect for tradition is a manifestation of the will to find an identity within two cultures, Afro-Caribbean and European, for both have played a vital role in his process of maturing as an artist."

Eddie Chambers has characterised Forrester's work as ranging from "dark, brooding and sometimes menacing works, through to bright, liberated paintings resonating with bright and vibrant colours", his subject matter encompassing the atmosphere of nightclubs and of carnival, typically using large-scale canvases to produce paintings that critic John Russell Taylor has called "distinctive and unmistakable". Together with its depictions of street scenes and social commentary about city life, particularly dealing with the racial tensions of the 1980s in the UK, Forrester's work has been described as "a series of historical documents related to the making of Black Britain".

Selected exhibitions
2020: Itchin & Scratchin, Nottingham Contemporary
2019: Denzil Forrester: A Survey, Stephen Friedman Gallery
2018: From Trench Town to Porthowan, Jackson Foundation Gallery, Cornwall
2015: No Colour Bar: Black British Art in Action 1960–1990, Guildhall Art Gallery, London
2008: Quad, Gallery in Cork Street, London
2005: Artists Doing It For Themselves, Farringdon, London
2001: Fresh Art, Business Design Centre, London
2000: The Selectors, Madeleine Pearson Gallery, London
1997: Transforming the Crown: African, Asian and Caribbean Artists in Britain, 1966–1996, The Studio Museum in Harlem and The Bronx Museum of Art
—Foundations of Fame, The London Institute
1996–97: Imagined Communities, Royal Festival Hall, London

1995: The London Art Group, Barbican Art Gallery
—The Caribbean Connection, Islington Arts Factory (15 September–13 October)
1990: Rome Scholars 1980–90, Royal College of Art
—Denzil Forrester: Dub Transition: A Decade of Paintings 1980–1990, Harris Museum & Art Gallery, Preston (22 September–3 November)
1989: Caribbean Expressions in Britain, Leicester Museum and Art Gallery.
1988: New Figurative Painters, The Orangery, London
—Figuring Out the 80s, Laing Gallery, Newcastle
—Painters at the Royal College of Art, 150th Anniversary Show
1987: Royal Academy of Art Summer Show
1986: From Two Worlds, Whitechapel Gallery, London (30 July–7 September)
1985: Six Artists in Action, Madeleine Pearson Gallery London

References

External links
 Denzil Forrester official website

1956 births
Living people
20th-century British male artists
20th-century English artists
21st-century English artists
21st-century male artists
Alumni of the Royal College of Art
Black British artists
Grenadian artists
Grenadian emigrants to England
Members of the Order of the British Empire